Kurt Joseph Ucko (August 25, 1921 – July 2, 2018) was an American field hockey player who competed in the 1956 Summer Olympics. He was born in Frankfurt am Main.

References

External links
 

1921 births
2018 deaths
American male field hockey players
Olympic field hockey players of the United States
Field hockey players at the 1956 Summer Olympics
Sportspeople from Frankfurt
German emigrants to the United States